Night Beats is an American psychedelic/garage rock project, formed in 2009 in Seattle, Washington as the pseudonym of Danny Lee "Blackwell" Rajan Billingsley. The project has remained active internationally throughout the years, touring with The Zombies, W.I.T.C.H., The Jesus and Mary Chain and The Black Angels.

History
Danny "Lee Blackwell" Rajan Billingsley had previously fronted various bands in his hometown of Dallas, Texas including The Old Explosives, White Light Fever and Medicine God Box. With White Light Fever, who were initially called Japanese Auto Clinic, he released debut album Heavy Knife Blues in 2007 and the band were reportedly courted by Columbia Records. A second album Count All Your Father's Wealth was seemingly abandoned. 

Raised Catholic and Hindu, Billingsley moved to Seattle to study comparative religion at the University of Washington. Leaving Dallas, which he saw as "a wasteland of music", he founded Night Beats in 2009. Named after the Sam Cooke album 'Night Beat', the solo self-recorded Street (Atomic) EP was released that year via Holy Twist Records.  

Early Night Beats recordings such as H-Bomb were done solo as a one man project, and rotating members were added as he began to tour. Night Beats completed multiple North American tours during 2010, and were signed within weeks of self-releasing the H-Bomb EP, picked up by Chicago's Trouble in Mind Records (Ty Segall, Fresh and Only's, Hex Dispensers, etc.). The re-release of the EP topped several college radio charts.

On June 28, 2011 the band released their self-titled debut album via Trouble In Mind. They also released a split EP with The UFO Club on the Austin label The Reverberation Appreciation Society. A split single with TRMRS was released in June 2012 via Volcom Vinyl Club. In 2013, the band released their second album "Sonic Bloom" via The Reverberation Appreciation Society.and toured North America, Europe, Israel, South Africa and Australia. Shortly after he released an EP entitled What Colors Last via Burger Records featuring the now deceased musician Joshua Vega and the full length self released album "Soul Fuckers"  in 2015 along with a west coast tour with Tomorrow's Tulips.

In 2015, the band signed to London-based label Heavenly Recordings and released their third album "Who Sold My Generation" in January 2016. The album featured Black Rebel Motorcycle Club member Robert Levon Been on bass, who also co-produced the album. By 2019, the band released their fourth album Myth Of A Man. The album was recorded by Billingsley with producer and  Black Keys frontman Dan Auerbach. For the sessions, Billingsley was backed by a cast of old time session musicians who had worked with the likes of Elvis Presley and Aretha Franklin. 

In late 2020, Blackwell signed Night Beats to Fuzz Club Records. Outlaw R&B, the fifth Night Beats studio album was released on June 4, 2021. A live album, Levitation Sessions, was released via The Reverberation Appreciation Society in August 2021. In 2022, Danny teamed up with Carolina Faruolo (ex-Los Bitchos) to release the Tropicalia influenced album Monte Carlo on the Seattle based Suicide Squeeze Records.

Notably, the song "Right/Wrong," was the official song of the Melbourne Queer Film Festival in 2022.

Band members

Current
 Danny "Lee Blackwell" Rajan Billingsley - Vocals, lead guitar

Former
 Tarek Wegner - Bass
 James Traeger - Drums
 Jakob Bowden - Bass

Discography

Studio albums
 Night Beats - 2011 (Trouble In Mind Records)
 Sonic Bloom - 2013 (The Reverberation Appreciation Society)
 Who Sold My Generation - 2016 (Heavenly Recordings)
 Myth of a Man - 2019 (Heavenly Recordings)
 Outlaw R&B - 2021 (Fuzz Club Records)

Singles/Splits/EPs
 H-Bomb 7" - 2010 (Self-Released)
 H-Bomb 7" - 2010 (Trouble In Mind Records)
 H-Bomb EP (iTunes) - 2010 (Holy Twist)
 Night Beats/UFO Club Split 10" - 2011 (The Reverberation Appreciation Society)
 Night Beats/TRMRS Split 7" - 2012 (Volcom Entertainment/Resurrection Records)
Night Beats/ Her Cold Cold Heart - 2018 (Heavenly Recordings / [PIAS])

Compilations
 Get Wyld! Vol. 1 - 2010 (Holy Twist)
 Portable Shrines Magic Sound Theatre Vol. 1 - 2011 (Translinguistic Other/Light In The Attic)
 Sailor Jerry Vol. 4 - 2011 (Sailor Jerry Rum)

References

External links
Official Website

Musical groups from Seattle
Garage rock groups from Washington (state)
American psychedelic rock music groups
American musical trios